Transbrasil operated scheduled services to the destinations below. This includes destinations served by subsidiaries Interbrasil Star, Aerobrasil and also destinations operated under the airline original name Sadia.

Europe
Austria
Vienna – Schwechat Airport 
Portugal
Lisbon – Portela Airport 
Netherlands 
Amsterdam – Schiphol Airport 
United Kingdom
London – Gatwick Airport

North America
United States
Miami – Miami International Airport 
New York City – John F. Kennedy International Airport 
Orlando – Orlando International Airport
Washington, D.C. – Dulles International Airport

South America
Argentina
Buenos Aires – Ezeiza/Ministro Pistarini International Airport 
Córdoba – Ingeniero Aeronáutico Ambrosio L.V. Taravella International Airport
Brazil
Aracaju – Santa Maria Airport 
Bauru – Bauru Airport
Belém – Val de Cães International Airport 
Belmonte
Belo Horizonte
Pampulha/Carlos Drummond de Andrade Airport 
Confins/Pres. Tancredo Neves International Airport 
Brasília – Pres. Juscelino Kubitschek International Airport
Caçador – Caçador Airport
Caculé
Caetité 
Campina Grande – Pres. João Suassuna Airport
Campinas – Viracopos International Airport
Campo Grande - Campo Grande International Airport
Caratinga
Caravelas – Caravelas Airport    
Cascavel – Adalberto Mendes da Silva Airport  
Chapecó – Serafin Enoss Bertaso Airport
Cianorte – Gastão de Mesquita Filho Airport
Concórdia – Olavo Cecco Rigon Airport
Criciúma – Diomício Freitas Airport 
Cuiabá – Marechal Rondon International Airport 
Curitiba – Afonso Pena International Airport
Diamantina – Diamantina Airport
Erechim – Erechim Airport
Feira de Santana – Feira de Santana Airport
Fernando de Noronha – Fernando de Noronha Airport
Florianópolis – Hercílio Luz International Airport 
Fortaleza – Pinto Martins International Airport 
Foz do Iguaçu – Cataratas International Airport 
Garanhuns – Garanhuns Airport
Goiânia – Santa Genoveva Airport
Ilhéus – Jorge Amado Airport
Itabuna
Jacobina
Januária – Januária Airport
Jequié
Joaçaba – Santa Terezinha Airport
João Pessoa – Pres. Castro Pinto International Airport
Joinville – Lauro Carneiro de Loyola Airport 
Juazeiro do Norte (Cariri) – Juazeiro do Norte Airport
Lages – Lages Airport
Lagoa Vermelha
Londrina – Gov. José Richa Airport 
Maceió – Zumbi dos Palmares International Airport 
Manaus
Eduardo Gomes International Airport 
Ponta Pelada Airport
Maringá – Sílvio Name Júnior Airport 
Montes Claros – Montes Claros Airport 
Nanuque 
Natal – Augusto Severo International Airport 
Navegantes – Ministro Victor Konder International Airport 
Pato Branco – Pato Branco Airport 
Penedo
Petrolina – Petrolina Airport 
Poços de Caldas – Poços de Caldas Airport 
Porto Alegre – Salgado Filho International Airport 
Porto Seguro – Porto Seguro Airport 
Prado
Quixadá
Recife – Guararapes/Gilberto Freyre International Airport 
Ribeirão Preto – Dr. Leite Lopes Airport 
Rio de Janeiro
Galeão/Antonio Carlos Jobim International Airport 
Santos Dumont Airport 
Salinas
Salvador – Dep. Luís Eduardo Magalhães International Airport 
São José do Rio Preto – Prof. Eribelto Manoel Reino Airport
São Lourenço – São Lourenço Airport   
São Luís – Mal. Cunha Machado International Airport 
São Paulo
Congonhas Airport 
Guarulhos/Gov. André Franco Montoro International Airport 
Teresina – Teresina Airport
Toledo – Toledo Airport
Uberlândia – Ten. Cel. Av. César Bombonato Airport 
Umuarama – Orlando de Carvalho Airport
Varginha – Varginha Airport 
Videira – Ângelo Ponzoni Airport 
Vitória – Eurico de Aguiar Salles Airport 
Vitória da Conquista – Vitória da Conquista Airport 
Chile
Santiago de Chile – Comodoro Arturo Merino Benítez International Airport

References

Lists of airline destinations
Transbrasil